Mary Ellen Bews (20 August 1856–29 March 1945) was a New Zealand school principal and educationalist . She was born in Glasgow, Lanarkshire, Scotland on 20 August 1856. She was the founder and manager of Mount Eden College in 1895–1914, one of the first colleges for girls in New Zealand.

References

1856 births
1945 deaths
Scottish emigrants to New Zealand
19th-century New Zealand businesspeople
19th-century New Zealand businesswomen
19th-century  New Zealand educators